In geometry, a rhombicosidodecahedral prism or small rhombicosidodecahedral prism is a convex uniform polychoron (four-dimensional polytope).

It is one of 18 convex uniform polyhedral prisms created by using uniform prisms to connect pairs of Platonic solids or Archimedean solids in parallel hyperplanes.

Alternative names 
 (small) rhombicosidodecahedral dyadic prism (Norman W. Johnson) 
 Sriddip (Jonathan Bowers: for small-rhombicosidodecahedral prism) 
 (small) rhombicosidodecahedral hyperprism

External links 
 
 

4-polytopes